The Peninsula Tokyo is a 24-story luxury skyscraper hotel located in Yurakucho, Chiyoda, Tokyo, Japan. The hotel is operated by The Peninsula Hotel Group, and is the only Peninsula branded Hotel in Japan. It is owned by Hong Kong and Shanghai Hotels. In January 2012, the Peninsula Tokyo was awarded as the second best hotel in the world by American travel magazine Travel + Leisures annual '500 Best Hotels' List, only being beaten by the Mandarin Oriental, Tokyo, also in Japan. The Spa at the hotel was also awarded the 2011 Readers Choice award for favourite Spa in Japan by Spa Finder USA. The hotel is also the first free-standing luxury hotel to be built in Tokyo in more than 10 years with direct street access, and it is described as 'international in design, but Japanese by inspiration.'  The hotel is involved in Breast Cancer awareness and proudly supports the Japan Breast Cancer Screening Society.

Restaurants and bars
The Lobby
Hei Fung Terrace
Sushi Wakon
Peter
The Peninsula Boutique & Café

See also 
 The Peninsula Bangkok
 The Peninsula Hotels
 The Peninsula Hong Kong
 The Peninsula Manila

References

External links 
 Official website

Hotel buildings completed in 2007
Hotels established in 2007
2007 establishments in Japan
Skyscraper hotels in Tokyo
Tokyo
Buildings and structures in Chiyoda, Tokyo